Six assembly by-elections were held on 23 September and 21 October 2019, to the six vacant seats in the Kerala Niyamasabha which consists of 140 constituencies in total.

By-election took place in two phases. The first phase was conducted on 23 September for Pala Constituency. 
The remaining 5 assembly constituencies (Manjeshwaram, Ernakulam, Aroor, Konni and Vattiyoorkavu) voted to elect their representatives on 21 October.
The counting of votes was conducted on 27 September in Pala and on 24 October in the other five constituencies.

Schedule for the by-elections

Pala
The first phase by-election was held for the Pala Constituency in Kerala.

Manjeshwaram, Ernakulam, Aroor, Konni and Vattiyoorkavu
The second phase by-elections were held for the remaining 5 vacant assembly constituencies in Kerala.

Electorates 
There were 11,36,616 electorates from the six Niyamasabha constituencies where the by-elections were held. Constituency wise details are given below:

Alliances and parties 
There are two major political coalitions in Kerala. The United Democratic Front (UDF) is the coalition of centrist and center-left parties led by the Indian National Congress. The Left Democratic Front (LDF) is the coalition of left-wing and far-left parties, led by the Communist Party of India (Marxist) (CPI(M)).

They are a coalition of left-wing political parties in Kerala. It is one of the two major political coalitions in the state, the other being the UDF, both of which has been in power alternatively for the last two decades. After winning a majority of the seats in the Niyamasabha elections, they are currently in power. The coalition consists of CPI(M), CPI and a variety of other smaller parties. LDF fields four CPI(M) candidates, an NCP candidate and an independent to fight in the by-poll.

It is an alliance of central-wing political parties in the state, created by the prominent INC party leader K. Karunakaran in the 1970s. UDF fielded four INC candidates, an IUML candidate and an independent for the vacant constituencies.

It is a coalition of right-leaning political parties in India. NDA gave all the six seats for the BJP to contest.

Constituency-wise Candidates 

The LDF fielded four CPI(M) candidates, an NCP candidate and an independent to win the seats. UDF fielded four INC candidates, an IUML candidate and an independent. NDA fielded six BJP candidates.

Exit Polls 

The Manorama News and the Mathrubhumi News published their exit poll predictions in the constituencies where the election was held on 21 October 2019. Asianet News had published their exit poll predictions for Pala, where the election was held earlier.

Polling day 
 
Polling took place on 23 September 2019 in Pala and on 21 October 2019 in the remaining five Niyamasabha constituencies.

Results in a glance 
The results at a glance are given below:

By alliance 
Both the LDF and the UDF won three seats each. The NDA could not win any seats.

Party-wise 
Each of the CPI(M) and the INC won in two seats. The remaining two seats were bagged by the NCP and the IUML respectively.

By district

By constituency

Detailed results

1. Manjeshwaram

82. Ernakulam

93. Pala

102. Aroor

114. Konni

133. Vattiyoorkavu

List of the newly elected MLAs to the 14th Kerala Niyamasabha 

As a result of the 2019 Kerala Legislative Assembly by-elections, six new members were elected to the Kerala Niyamasabha.

Assembly seat share post by-elections 

After the 2019 Kerala Legislative Assembly by-elections, the composition of 14th Kerala Legislative Assembly changed as per given below:

The Kerala Niyamasabha is composed of 141 seats (140 elected and 1 nominated). After the by-elections, the Government of Kerala has the support of 93 members.

Total (141)

Government (93) 
LDF (93)
 CPI(M) (60)
 CPI (19)
 JD(S) (3)
 NCP (3)
 C(S) (1)
 KC(B) (1)
 NSC (1)
 IND (5)

Opposition (47)
UDF (45)
 INC (21)
 IUML (18)
 KC(M) (5)
 KC(J) (1)
NDA (2)
 BJP (1)
 KJ(S) (1)
 Others(1)
  Nominated (1)

See also 

 2016 Kerala Legislative Assembly election
 Kerala Legislative Assembly
 2019 Indian general election in Kerala
 2019 elections in India

References

External links
Chief Electoral Officer,Kerala
Election Commission of India
UDF Kerala
LDF Keralam
NDA Kerala

2019
2019
2010s in Kerala
2019 State Assembly elections in India